Infinity is a mathematical concept that is involved in almost all branches of mathematics, and used in many scientific and non-scientific areas.

Infinity or infinities may also refer to:

 Infinity (philosophy), a related philosophical and metaphysical concept

Mathematics
 Infinity symbol 
 Aleph number, symbols for representing different kinds of mathematical infinity
 Axiom of infinity
 Actual infinity

Buildings
 The Infinity, a highrise condo in San Francisco, California, US
 Infinity Tower (Dubai), former name of the Cayan Tower skyscraper in Dubai, UAE
 Infinity Tower (Brisbane), a skyscraper in Australia
 Tower Infinity, a skyscraper in Korea

Technology
 BT Infinity, a broadband service in the United Kingdom provided by BT Retail
 GTS Infinity, a celebrity Millennium-Class cruise ship
 Infinity Firearms, a brand name of Strayer Voight Inc, manufacturer of M1911-styled pistols
 Infinity Engine, a game engine used in several popular computer role-playing games
 U-Turn Infinity, a German paraglider design

Organizations
 Infinity Broadcasting Corporation, now known as CBS Radio, one of the largest radio corporations in the United States
 Infinity Systems, a manufacturer of loudspeakers
 Infinity Power Chutes, an American aircraft manufacturer

Arts and entertainment
 Infinity (film), a 1996 biographical film starring Matthew Broderick as physicist Richard Feynman

Games
 Infinity (AberMUD), a 1993 text-based online role-playing game
 Infinity (LPMud), another text-based online role-playing game
 Infinity (wargame), a science fiction 28mm miniature skirmish game
 Infinity Blade, a 2010 iOS fighting game developed by Chair Entertainment and Epic Games
 Infinity Blade II, the sequel to Infinity Blade
 Infinity Blade III, the sequel to Infinity Blade II and the final installment in the series
 Infinity (video game series), a series of visual novel games produced by KID
 Never 7: The End of Infinity, which was originally released as Infinity
 Disney Infinity, a combined video game and toy line featuring Disney characters and worlds
 Ace Combat Infinity, a 2014 free-to-play flight action game (with game's services discontinued in 2018) for the PlayStation 3
 Infinity (role-playing game), a tabletop role-playing game

Print media
 Infinity Science Fiction, a science fiction magazine
 Infinity (comic book), a crossover comic book published by Marvel Comics in 2013
 Infinity Comics, a digital comics lineup exclusive to Marvel Unlimited which feature the vertical scroll format 
 Infinity, Inc., a team of superheroes appearing in comic books published by DC Comics
 Star Wars Infinities, a 2002-2004 Star Wars comic book published by Dark Horse Comics
 The Infinities, a 2009 novel by John Banville

Music
 Infinity Recordings, a British record label
 Infinity Records, a short-lived American record label from the 1970s
 Infinity (band), a Eurodance band from Norway
 Infinity (producer) (born 1983), American record producer

Albums
 Infinity (Charice album), 2011
 Infinity (Crematory album)
 Infinity (Deep Obsession album), 1999
 Infinity (Devin Townsend album), 1998
 Infinity (End of Green album), the debut album of German alternative metal band End Of Green
 Infinity (f.i.r. album)
 Infinity (Guru Josh album), the debut album by English acid house musician Guru Josh
 Infinity (Jesu album), 2009
 Infinity (John Coltrane album), 1972
 Infinity (Journey album), 1978
 Infinity (K-Space album), 2008
 Infinity (Lee Morgan album), 1981
 Infinity (McCoy Tyner album), 1995
 Infinity (Oscar and the Wolf album)
 Infinity (Plavi orkestar album), 1999
 Infinity (Shtar album), the debut studio album by Jewish hip hop band Shtar
 Infinity, by Scarlxrd, 2019
 Infinity (Tom Harrell album), 2019
 Infinity, by Trout Fishing in America
 Infinity (Vivid album), 2012
 Infinity (Yann Tiersen album), by French musician Yann Tiersen released in 2014
 Infinity (EP), by Emi Tawata
 Infinity (Against the Current EP), an EP by Against the Current
 #1 to Infinity, a 2015 compilation by Mariah Carey

Songs
 "Infinity" (Girl Next Door song), 2009
 "Infinity" (Guru Josh song), 1989
 "Infinity" (Infinity Ink song), 2012
 "Infinity" (Mariah Carey song), 2015
 "Infinity" (One Direction song), 2015
 "Infinity" (Jaymes Young song), 2017
 "Infinity", a song by AJR from their 2015 album Living Room
 "Infinity", a song by Amaranthe from The Nexus, 2013
 "Infinity", a song by Hawkwind from PXR5, 1979
 "Infinity", a song by Mohombi, 2016
 "Infinity", a song by Stratovarius from Infinite, 2000

Other uses
 Infinity (yacht), a yacht delivered in 2015
 Infinity (de Rivera), a 1967 sculpture by Jose de Rivera

See also

 
 
 
 Infinity sign (disambiguation)
 Infiniti (disambiguation)
 Infini (disambiguation)
 Infinite (disambiguation)
 Lemniscate (disambiguation)